Robert David Paul (born February 6, 1987) is an American soccer player who plays for Sporting AZ FC in the United Premier Soccer League.

Career
Paul played college soccer at Southern Wesleyan University from 2005 to 2008, earning all-conference honors and All-American honors every season.

After college, Paul travelled to Argentina and England, earning trials with West Ham United and Milton Keynes Dons, but didn't earn a contract with either club.

Returning to the US, Paul coached at Grand Canyon University for a year, before eventually earning his first professional contract with Polish club Puszcza Niepołomice in 2011.

After two years in Poland, Paul returned to the US to play with USL Pro club Phoenix FC. Paul scored a brace on his Phoenix debut on July 27, 2013 during a 4-0 victory over Charlotte Eagles.

References

External links
 USL Pro profile

1987 births
Living people
American soccer players
Phoenix FC players
FC Arizona players
USL Championship players
Soccer players from Arizona
National Premier Soccer League players
Florida Tropics SC players
Association football midfielders
Southern Wesleyan University alumni
United Premier Soccer League players
St. Louis Ambush (2013–) players
Major Arena Soccer League players
Puszcza Niepołomice players
Expatriate footballers in Poland
American expatriate soccer players
American expatriate sportspeople in Poland